Princess Maria Immaculata of Bourbon-Two Sicilies (Full Italian name: Maria Immacolata Clementina, Principessa di Borbone delle Due Sicilie) (14 April 1844, Naples, Kingdom of the Two Sicilies – 18 February 1899, Vienna, Austria) was fifth child and second-eldest daughter of Ferdinand II of the Two Sicilies and his wife Maria Theresa of Austria. Through her marriage to Archduke Karl Salvator of Austria, Maria Immaculata became an Austrian Archduchess.

Early life

Maria Immaculata was modest and reserved growing up and was jokingly called by her father "Petitta." Her mother, Maria Theresa, detested parties and court life and instead, she devoted herself to the care of her children and sewing. After the fall of the Kingdom of the Two Sicilies during the Expedition of the Thousand, the royal family fled to Rome where they resided at the Quirinal Palace at the invitation of the Pope Pius IX.

Marriage and issue
Maria Immaculata married Archduke Karl Salvator of Austria, fifth child and second-eldest son of Leopold II, Grand Duke of Tuscany and his wife Princess Maria Antonia of the Two Sicilies, on 19 September 1861 in Rome. Maria Immaculata and Karl Salvator had ten children:

Archduchess Maria Theresia (Alt-Bunzlau, 18 September 1862 – Saybusch, 10 May 1933), married in Vienna on 28 February 1886 Archduke Charles Stephen of Austria (Gross-Seelowitz, 5 September 1860 – Saybusch, 7 April 1933)
Archduke Leopold Salvator (Alt-Bunzlau, Bohemia, 15 October 1863 – Vienna, 4 September 1931), married in Frohsdorf on 24 October 1889 Blanca, Infanta of Spain (Graz, 7 September 1868 – Viareggio, 25 October 1949), and had issue
Archduke Franz Salvator (Alt-Münster, 21 August 1866 – Vienna, 20 April 1939), married firstly in Ischl on 31 July 1890 Archduchess Marie Valerie of Austria (Ofen, 22 April 1868 – Schloss Wallsee, 6 September 1924), and had issue, and married secondly morganatically in Vienna on 28 April 1934 Melanie Freiin von Riesenfels (Seisenegg, Lower Austria, 20 September 1898 – Amstetten, 10 November 1984), without issue
Archduchess Karoline Marie (Alt-Münster, 5 September 1869 – Budapest, 12 May 1945), married in Vienna on 30 May 1894 Prince August Leopold of Saxe-Coburg and Gotha (Rio de Janeiro, Rio de Janeiro, 6 December 1867 – Schladming, 11 October 1922)
Archduke Albrecht Salvator (Alt-Bunzlau, 22 November 1871 – Bolzano, 27 February 1896), unmarried and without issue
Archduchess Maria Antoinette (Vienna, 18 April 1874 – Arco, 14 January 1891)
Archduchess Maria Immakulata (Baden bei Wien, 3 September 1878 – Schloss Altshausen, 25 November 1968), married in Vienna on 29 October 1900 Duke Robert of Württemberg (Meran, 14 January 1873 – Schloss Altshausen, 12 April 1947)
Archduke Rainer Salvator (Vienna, 27 February 1880 – Arco, 4 May 1889)
Archduchess Henriette (Vienna, 20 February 1884 – Traunkirchen, 13 August 1886)
Archduke Ferdinand Salvator (Baden bei Wien, 2 June 1888 – Traunkirchen, 28 July 1891)

Later life
Maria Immaculata was known for her beauty.  She was included in Empress Elisabeth of Austria's photo album of beautiful women.  Because Maria Immaculata's husband gave her a pearl necklace each time she bore another child, Empress Elisabeth mockingly nicknamed the family "The Pearl Divers".  Eventually, Empress Elisabeth's youngest daughter Archduchess Marie Valerie married Maria Immaculata's son Franz Salvator.

Ancestry

References

External links

1844 births
1899 deaths
19th-century Neapolitan people
House of Habsburg-Lorraine
Austrian princesses
Princesses of Bourbon-Two Sicilies
Italian Roman Catholics
Burials at the Imperial Crypt
Daughters of kings